Jonathan Cherry (born February 3, 1977) is a Canadian actor. He is best known for his role as Rory Peters in the supernatural horror film Final Destination 2 (2003). His other notable film roles include House of the Dead (2003) and Goon (2011).

Early life
Jonathan Cherry was born in Montreal, Quebec on December 3, 1978. However, he grew up in Toronto, Ontario. Cherry attended Vancouver Film School and graduated with a degree in acting.

Filmography

Roles

Self
The Making of: House of the Dead (2004) (V)
Bits and Pieces: Bringing Death to Life (2003) (V)

External links

1978 births
21st-century Canadian male actors
Anglophone Quebec people
Canadian male film actors
Canadian male television actors
Living people
Male actors from Montreal